Rhoemetalces, also known as Rhoimetalces (fl. 2nd century AD; died 153), was a Roman client king of the Bosporan Kingdom.

Life 
When Cotys II died in 131, Rhoemetalces succeeded him as king. The relationship between Rhoemetalces and previous kings is not known, though it is possible that he was a son of Cotys II. Rhoemetalces ruled as Bosporan king from 131 until 153. He was a contemporary to the rule of the Roman Emperors Hadrian and Antoninus Pius. On coinage his royal title is in Greek: ΒΑΣΙΛΕΩΣ ΡΟΙΜΗΤΑΛΚΟΥ ("of King Rhoemetalces").

According to the Historia Augusta, at an unknown date in the reign of Antoninus Pius, Rhoemetalces travelled to Rome for a hearing of a dispute between him and the imperial commissioner. The nature and causes leading to this dispute are unknown. After the hearing had concluded, the Emperor sent him back to the Bosporan Kingdom. 

Rhoemetalces appears to have been religious and was involved in the worship of Aphrodite and her cult. This can be confirmed by an inscription found on a statue base from Phanagoria.

Not much more is otherwise known of his reign and life. He was succeeded by Eupator, who might have been his brother. Rhoemetalces is known to have had at least one son, Sauromates II, who succeeded Eupator as king in the 170s.

See also
 Bosporan Kingdom
 Roman Crimea

References

Monarchs of the Bosporan Kingdom
Roman client rulers
153 deaths
2nd-century monarchs in Europe
Year of birth unknown
Rhoemetalces, Tiberius